Fars-Nama-ye Naseri (literally "Naseri's Book on Fars") is a Persian-language book on geography and history of Fars Province in Iran, with illustrations and maps, by Hasan Fasāʾī (1821-1898). Authorship of this book was assigned by Naser al-Din Shah Qajar. Volume two also covers the climate of Fars Province, its vegetation, agriculture and fauna, cartography, and the position of Fars province based on longitude and latitude.

References
The information in this article is based on that in its Persian equivalent.   
 Idem, “Merchants of Shiraz in the Late 19th Century,” a monograph prepared at the Center for Middle Eastern Studies, Harvard University, 1987. 
 A. Banuazizi and A. Ashraf, “The Urban Elite and Notables of Shiraz in the Late Nineteenth Century,” paper presented at the 11th Annual Meeting of the Middle East Studies Association, New York, November 1977. 
 Fasāʾī, tr. Busse. D. Demorgny, “Les réformes administratives en Perse: Les tribus du Fars,” RMM 22, 1913, pp. 85–150; 23, 1913, pp. 3–108 (based entirely on Fasāʾī’s work).
 D. A. Lane, “Hajjī Mīrzā Ḥasan-i Shīrāzī on the Nomadic Tribes of Fārs in the Fārs-nāmeh-i Nāṣirī,” JRAS, 1923, pp. 209–31.

External links

 The Encyclopædia Iranica

Iranian books
Writers
Iranian literature
19th-century history books
Geography books
History books about Iran
Qajar Iran
History of Fars Province